This article describes the history of cricket in India from the 1970–71 season until 1985.

Events
Bombay continued its dominance of Indian domestic cricket with only Karnataka and Delhi able to mount any kind of challenge during this period.

India enjoyed two international highlights.  In 1971, under Ajit Wadekar's captaincy they won a Test series in England for the first time ever, surprisingly defeating Ray Illingworth's Ashes winners and won series in West Indies.   In 1983, again in England, India were surprise winners of the 1983 Cricket World Cup.

Domestic cricket

Ranji Trophy winners
 1970–71 – Bombay
 1971–72 – Bombay
 1972–73 – Bombay
 1973–74 – Karnataka
 1974–75 – Bombay
 1975–76 – Bombay
 1976–77 – Bombay
 1977–78 – Karnataka
 1978–79 – Delhi
 1979–80 – Delhi
 1980–81 – Bombay
 1981–82 – Delhi
 1982–83 – Karnataka
 1983–84 – Bombay
 1984–85 – Bombay

International tours of India

England 1972–73
 1st Test at Feroz Shah Kotla, Delhi – England won by 6 wickets
 2nd Test at Eden Gardens, Calcutta – India won by 28 runs
 3rd Test at MA Chidambaram Stadium, Chepauk, Madras – India won by 4 wickets
 4th Test at Modi Stadium, Kanpur – match drawn	
 5th Test at Brabourne Stadium, Bombay – match drawn

Sri Lanka 1972–73

West Indies 1974–75
 1st Test at M Chinnaswamy Stadium, Bangalore – West Indies won by 267 runs
 2nd Test at Feroz Shah Kotla, Delhi – West Indies won by an innings and 17 runs
 3rd Test at Eden Gardens, Calcutta – India won by 85 runs
 4th Test at MA Chidambaram Stadium, Chepauk, Madras – India won by 100 runs
 5th Test at Wankhede Stadium, Bombay – West Indies won by 201 runs

Sri Lanka 1975–76

New Zealand 1976–77
 1st Test at Wankhede Stadium, Bombay – India won by 162 runs
 2nd Test at Modi Stadium, Kanpur – match drawn	
 3rd Test at MA Chidambaram Stadium, Chepauk, Madras – India won by 216 runs

England 1976–77
 1st Test at Feroz Shah Kotla, Delhi – England won by an innings and 25 runs
 2nd Test at Eden Gardens, Calcutta – England won by 10 wickets
 3rd Test at MA Chidambaram Stadium, Chepauk, Madras – England won by 200 runs
 4th Test at M Chinnaswamy Stadium, Bangalore – India won by 140 runs
 5th Test at Wankhede Stadium, Bombay – match drawn

West Indies 1978–79
 1st Test at Wankhede Stadium, Bombay – match drawn	
 2nd Test at M Chinnaswamy Stadium, Bangalore – match drawn	
 3rd Test at Eden Gardens, Calcutta – match drawn	
 4th Test at MA Chidambaram Stadium, Chepauk, Madras – India won by 3 wickets
 5th Test at Feroz Shah Kotla, Delhi – match drawn	
 6th Test at Modi Stadium, Kanpur – match drawn

Australia 1979–80
 1st Test at MA Chidambaram Stadium, Chepauk, Madras – match drawn	
 2nd Test at M Chinnaswamy Stadium, Bangalore – match drawn	
 3rd Test at Modi Stadium, Kanpur – India won by 153 runs
 4th Test at Feroz Shah Kotla, Delhi – match drawn	
 5th Test at Eden Gardens, Calcutta – match drawn	
 6th Test at Wankhede Stadium, Bombay – India won by an innings and 100 runs

Pakistan 1979–80
 1st Test at M Chinnaswamy Stadium, Bangalore – match drawn	
 2nd Test at Feroz Shah Kotla, Delhi – match drawn	
 3rd Test at Wankhede Stadium, Bombay – India won by 131 runs
 4th Test at Modi Stadium, Kanpur – match drawn	
 5th Test at MA Chidambaram Stadium, Chepauk, Madras – India won by 10 wickets
 6th Test at Eden Gardens, Calcutta – match drawn

England 1979–80
 1st Test at Wankhede Stadium, Bombay – England won by 10 wickets

England 1981–82
 1st Test at Wankhede Stadium, Bombay – India won by 138 runs
 2nd Test at M Chinnaswamy Stadium, Bangalore – match drawn	
 3rd Test at Feroz Shah Kotla, Delhi – match drawn	
 4th Test at Eden Gardens, Calcutta – match drawn	
 5th Test at MA Chidambaram Stadium, Chepauk, Madras – match drawn	
 6th Test at Modi Stadium, Kanpur – match drawn

Sri Lanka 1982–83
 1st Test at MA Chidambaram Stadium, Chepauk, Madras – match drawn

Pakistan 1983–84
 1st Test at M Chinnaswamy Stadium, Bangalore – match drawn	
 2nd Test at Gandhi Stadium, Jalandhar – match drawn	
 3rd Test at Vidarbha Cricket Association Ground, Nagpur – match drawn

West Indies 1983–84
 1st Test at Modi Stadium, Kanpur – West Indies won by an innings and 83 runs
 2nd Test at Feroz Shah Kotla, Delhi – match drawn	
 3rd Test at Sardar Patel Stadium, Motera, Ahmedabad – West Indies won by 138  runs
 4th Test at Wankhede Stadium, Bombay – match drawn	
 5th Test at Eden Gardens, Calcutta – West Indies won by an innings and 46 runs
 6th Test at MA Chidambaram Stadium, Chepauk, Madras – match drawn

England 1984–85
For details of this tour see : English cricket team in India in 1984-85

References

External sources
 CricketArchive – Itinerary of Events in India

Further reading
 Mihir Bose, A History of Indian Cricket, Andre-Deutsch, 1990
 Ramachandra Guha, A Corner of a Foreign Field – An Indian History of a British Sport, Picador, 2001

1985
1985